Giovanni Volpato (1735–1803) was an Italian engraver. He was also an excavator, dealer in antiquities and manufacturer of biscuit porcelain figurines.

Biography
Giovanni Volpato was born in Bassano del Grappa (then in the state of Venice). He received his first training from his mother, an embroiderer, and then studied under Giovanni Antonio Remondini. In 1762 he went to Venice and worked with Joseph Wagner and Francesco Bartolozzi, engraving several plates after Piazzetta, Mariotto, Amiconi, Zuccarelli, Marco Ricci and others. He worked for some time for the Duke of Parma, until a plate of the Monument of Francesco Algarotti in Pisa brought him wider notice.

In 1771, following a suggestion of his patron Girolamo Zulian, he moved to Rome, where he founded a school of engraving and gained a reputation for his series of plates after the frescoes of the Raphael Rooms and Loggias in the Vatican (1770–77). Some of these plates were hand-colored by Francesco Panini, and did not necessarily reproduce the actual design or subjects of the Loggias' vaults and pilasters, but they became much in demand among visitors to Rome. Volpato also engraved a set of plates after Annibale Caracci's decorations in the Palazzo Farnese. He engraved a series of landscapes and vedute of Rome with Pietro Ducros.

Volpato was a friend of the British painter and antiquarian, Gavin Hamilton. When Volpato himself became an excavator, he supplied Hamilton with some sculptures and engravings for his Schola Italica Picturae, while Hamilton introduced him to clients interested in his findings and publications.

Volpato made excavations in Ostia (1779, with the antiquarian Thomas Jenkins), Porta San Sebastiano (1779) and  Quadraro (1780); and sold sculptures to king Gustav III of Sweden (1784), to the Vatican Museums, and to the British collector, Henry Blundell. In 1788 he sold the celebrated Lante Vase to Colonel John Campbell. In 1792, in collaboration with Louis Ducros, he published a series of prints of the interiors of the new Museo Pio-Clementino.

In 1785, he established a porcelain factory that made ceramic replicas of Greco-Roman originals to satisfy the demand for antique art during the Neoclassic period.

One of his pupils was his son in law,  Raffaello Morghen.  Volpato died in Rome.

Among his plates for Gavin Hamilton are:  
 Marriage of Alexander and Roxana.
 The four Sibyls; after Raphael.
 Perseus and Andromeda; after Polidoro da Caravaggio
 Modesty ami Vanity; after Leonardo da Vinci.
 Christ praying at the Mount; after Correggio.
 Feast in the house of Simon; after Paolo Veronese
 The Marriage of Cana; after Tintoretto.
 Gamblers after Michelangelo da Caravaggio.

Further reading
 Ilaria Bignamini, Clare Hornsby, Digging and Dealing in Eighteenth-Century Rome (2010. Yale U.P.), p. 339-340
 L. Melegati, 'Giovanni Volpato e il cantiere romano', in Ricordi dell'antico: sculture, porcellane e arredi all'epoca del Grand Tour, ed. A. d'Agliano, L. Melegati [exhibition catalogue, Musei Capitolini, Rome] (2008), p. 101-114
 F. Haskell, 'The Museo Pio-Clementino in Rome and the Views by Ducros and Volpato', in Louis Ducros: Images of the Grand Tour [exhibition catalogue, Kenwood House, London] (1985), p. 36-39
 C. Faccioli, 'Anni ed Epistolario romano d'un grande incisore bassanese, Giovanni Volpato', in L'Urbe; 32:3 (1969), p. 18-35
 H. Honour, 'Statuettes after the antique: Volpato's Roman porcelain factory', in Apollo; 85 (1967 May), p. 371-373

References

External links

 The River Nile porcelain piece at the Metropolitan Museum.

1735 births
1803 deaths
People from Bassano del Grappa
Italian engravers